Andrew Myers is an American politician serving in the Minnesota House of Representatives since 2023. A member of the Republican Party of Minnesota, Myers represents District 45A in the western Twin Cities metropolitan area, which includes the cities of Mound, Minnetrista, and Orono and parts of Hennepin County, Minnesota.

Early life, education and career 
Myers grew up in a small town in central Illinois. He attended Bradley University, earning a bachelor's degree in business and University of Montana for his Juris Doctor degree. Myers has lived in Minnesota for over 16 years, and served on the Minnetonka Beach City Council and Planning Commission and served on the Tonka Bay Parks and Docks Commission prior to his election to the legislature.

Minnesota House of Representatives 
Myers was first elected to the Minnesota House of Representatives in 2022, following redistricting and the retirement of Republican incumbent Jerry Hertaus. Myers serves on the Capital Investment, Housing Finance and Policy, and Labor and Industry Finance and Policy Committees.

Electoral history

Personal life 
Myers lives in Tonka Bay, Minnesota with his wife, Amanda, and has four children.

References

External links 

Living people
21st-century American politicians
Republican Party members of the Minnesota House of Representatives
Bradley University alumni
University of Montana alumni
Minnesota city council members
People from Hennepin County, Minnesota